The Pârâul Roșu is a right tributary of the river Olteț in Romania. It flows into the Olteț in Osica de Jos.

References

Rivers of Romania
Rivers of Olt County